The Abbichu Oromo were a subclan of the Tulama Tulama who lived in the Shewa province of Ethiopia. In 1841 William Cornwallis Harris mentioned them as allies of King Sahle Silassie of Shewa.

History 
The commander in chief of his army, Ayto Mirach, was from this clan. At that time they inhabited the land north of Galan tribe, South of Menz, west of Karayyu and east of Marhabiete. They became Christian in the 1830s, thus connecting the two Amhara dominions.

Ethnic groups in Ethiopia